Friedrich-Ludwig-Jahn-Stadion is a multi-use stadium in Herford, Germany. Matches of HSV Borussia Friedenstal are held in this stadium. The capacity of the stadium is 18,400 spectators.

External links
 Stadium information

Football venues in Germany
Buildings and structures in Herford (district)
Sports venues in North Rhine-Westphalia